The following is a list of notable deaths in December 1999.

Entries for each day are listed alphabetically by surname. A typical entry lists information in the following sequence:
 Name, age, country of citizenship at birth, subsequent country of citizenship (if applicable), reason for notability, cause of death (if known), and reference.

December 1999

1
Gene Baker, 74, American baseball player.
Ctirad Benáček, 75, Czech basketball player.
Stephen Brooks, 57, American actor (The F.B.I.), heart attack.
Fritz Fischer, 91, German historian.
Pop Gates, 82, American basketball player.
Santidev Ghosh, 89, Indian author, singer, actor and dancer.
Luigi Granelli, 70, Italian politician.
Marilyn Harris, 75, American child actress, cancer.
Jaakko Jalas, 79, Finnish botanist.
Tomás Pablo, 78, Chilean politician and architect.
Victor Perlo, 87, American Marxist economist.
Massimo Pupillo, 70, Italian film director.
Alexander Tatarenko, 74, Soviet Russian painter and art teacher.

2
Joey Adams, 88, American comedian, vaudevillian, radio host, and author.
Charlie Byrd, 74, American jazz guitarist, lung cancer.
Matt Cohen, 56, Canadian writer, lung cancer.
Giorgio Cristallini, 78, Italian screenwriter and film director.
Daniel J. Elazar, 65, American professor of political science.
Vladimir Kravtsov, 50, Soviet and Russian handball player and Olympic champion.
Ethelmary Oakland, 90, American child actress.
Mike Ockrent, 53, British stage director.

3
John Archer, 84, American film and television actor, lung cancer.
Enrique Cadícamo, 99, Argentine tango lyricist, poet and novelist, heart failure.
Anne Francine, 82, American actress and cabaret singer, stroke.
Conrad Hunte, 67, Barbadian cricketer, heart attack.
Scatman John, 57, American jazz musician and poet, lung cancer.
Madeline Kahn, 57, American actress (Young Frankenstein, Blazing Saddles, Clue), ovarian cancer.
Boris Kuznetsov, 71, Russian and Soviet football player.
Edmond Safra, 67, Lebanese Brazilian banker, smoke inhalation injury.
Walter Schleger, 70, Austrian football player.
Jarl Wahlström, 81, Finnish salvationist, 12th General of the Salvation Army.

4
Heinrich C. Berann, 84, Austrian painter and cartographer.
Rose Bird, 63, American first female justice, breast cancer.
Charlotte H. Bruner, 82, American scholar.
Sylvester Clarke, 44, West Indian cricketer, heart attack.
Slobodan Dimitrijević, 58, Serbian television and film actor.
Bert Hoffmeister, 92, Canadian Army officer, businessman, and conservationist.
Nilde Iotti, 79, Italian politician of the Communist Party, heart attack.
Barry Mahon, 78, American film director, cinematographer and producer.
Daishōhō Masami, 32, Japanese sumo wrestler, pancreatic cancer.
Sue Partridge, 69, British tennis player.
John Douglas Pringle, 87, Australian journalist.
Nélida Roca, 70, Argentinian showbusiness diva and sex symbol, heart attack.
Edward Vesala, 54, Finnish avant-garde jazz drummer, congestive heart failure.
Alick Walker, 74, British palaeontologist.

5
Claude Ballot-Léna, 63, French racing driver, cancer.
Edvin Biuković, 30, Croatian comics artist, brain tumor.
Joseph Andorfer Ewan, 90, American botanist, naturalist, and historian of botany and natural history.
Lajos Faluvégi, 75, Hungarian politician.
Nathan Jacobson, 89, Polish-American mathematician.
Bobby Marchan, 69, American R&B singer-songwriter, liver cancer.
Edoardo Martino, 89, Italian politician.
Bohumil Musil, 77, Czech football player and manager.
Masaru Sato, 71, Japanese composer of film scores.
Kendall Taylor, 94, British pianist.

6
Paul Bacon, 92, French politician.
Alexander Baron, 82, British author and screenwriter.
Gwyn Jones, 92, Welsh novelist and story writer.
Martha Sharp, 94, American unitarian.
Robert A. Swanson, American venture capitalist, brain cancer.
Stan Wallace, 68, American gridiron football player (Chicago Bears).

7
Kenny Baker, 78, British jazz musician.
Darling Légitimus, 92, French actress.
Alfons Moog, 84, German football player.
William Wiley, 68, South African cricket player.

8
Ernst Günther, 66, Swedish actor and director, diabetes.
Rupert Hart-Davis, 92, English publisher.
Wally Hebert, 92, American baseball player.
František Ipser, 72, Czech football manager and player.
Péter Kuczka, 76, Hungarian writer, poet and science fiction editor.
Everett Carll Ladd, 62, American political scientist, heart failure.
Ange Le Strat, 81, French racing cyclist.
Pupella Maggio, 89, Italian film actress, cerebral hemorrhage.
Richard P. Powell, 91, American novelist.
Antônio Dias dos Santos, 51, Brazilian football player.
Néstor Togneri, 57, Argentine football player.

9
Oudom Khattigna, 69, Laotian communist politician, Vice President (1998-1999).
Whitey Kurowski, 81, American baseball player.
Yakov Rylsky, 71, Soviet sabre fencer and Olympic champion, liver cirrhosis.
Shinkichi Takemura, 67, Japanese Olympic speed skater.
Cecil H. Williamson, 90, British screenwriter, editor and film director.

10
Charles Assalé, 88, Cameroonian politician.
Antonio Blanco, 87, Spanish and American painter, heart and kidney disease.
Rick Danko, 56, Canadian musician, member of The Band, heart failure.
Pietro De Vico, 88, Italian film actor, stroke.
Ed Dorn, 70, American poet, pancreatic cancer.
Lex Goudsmit, 86, Dutch actor, stroke.
Shirley Hemphill, 52, American stand-up comedian and actress, renal failure.
Jean-Claude Michel, 74, French actor and voice actor.
Mike Randall, 80, British journalist and editor.
Niccolò Tucci, 91, Short story writer and novelist.
Franjo Tuđman, 77, Croatian politician, President of Croatia (since 1990), cancer.

11
Charles Earland, 58, American jazz organist, heart failure.
Enrica Follieri, 73, Italian philologist and paleographer.
Ed Jones, 87, American politician.
Jack Oldfield, 100, British landowner and politician.
Harry Wüstenhagen, 71, German film actor.
Hans K. Ziegler, 88, German-American satellite engineer.

12
James Balfour, 71, Canadian politician.
Huelet Benner, 82, American multi-discipline pistol shooter and Olympic champion.
Paul Cadmus, 94, American artist.
Gordon Chater, 77, English Australian comedian and actor.
Gaston Diehl, 87, French professor of art history and an art critic.
Joseph Heller, 76, American novelist (Catch-22), heart attack.
Ladislav Józsa, 51, Slovak football player.
Matty Kemp, 92, American film actor.
Luz Oliveros-Belardo, 93, Filipina pharmaceutical chemist.
Ignacio Quirós, 68, Argentine actor, cancer.
Leo Smit, 78, American composer and pianist, heart failure.
John W. R. Taylor, 77, British aviation expert.
Claes Thelander, 83, Swedish actor.

13
Peter Adams, 61, New Zealand-Australian actor, cancer.
Jill Craigie, 88, English documentary film director, screenwriter and feminist, heart failure.
Stane Dolanc, 74, Yugoslav communist politician, cerebral stroke.
Maury Gertsman, 92, American cinematographer.
Tarmo Uusivirta, 42, Finnish professional boxer, suicide.
Robert Wagenhoffer, 39, American figure skater, complications of AIDS.
Ian Watt, 82, English literary critic and academic.
Lady Mary Whitley, 75, British noblewoman.

14
Sven Berlin, 88, English painter, writer and sculptor.
Sándor Holczreiter, 53, Hungarian weightlifter and Olympic medalist.
Douglas Leigh, 92, American advertising executive.
Walt Levinsky, 70, American big band player, composer, arranger and bandleader, brain cancer.
J. W. Lockett, 62, American football player.

15
Georges Aeby, 86, Swiss football player.
Rune Andréasson, 74, Swedish comic creator, cancer.
Francis L. K. Hsu, 90, Chinese-American anthropologist.
Eddie Kazak, 79, American baseball player.
León Martinetti, 73, Argentine basketball player.

16
Henry Helstoski, 74, American politician.
Dorit Kreysler, 90, Austrian film actress.
Ruth Welting, 50, American operatic soprano.
Jorge Tuero, Venezuelan television actor and comedian, killed during the Vargas tragedy.

17
Rex Allen, 78, American actor and singer-songwriter, traffic accident.
Leo P. Carlin, 91, American politician.
Ken W. Clawson, 63, American journalist and spokesman for U.S. President Richard Nixon, heart attack.
Paolo Dezza, 98, Italian Jesuit cardinal of the Catholic church.
François Dyrek, 66, French actor, heart attack.
Rufus Lewis, 80, American baseball pitcher.
Jürgen Moser, 71, German-American mathematician.
Grover Washington, Jr., 56, American jazz saxophonist, heart attack.
C. Vann Woodward, 91, American historian and Pulitzer prize winner.

18
Þór Beck, 59, Icelandic footballer.
Robert Bresson, 98, French film director.
Robert Dougall, 86, English broadcaster and ornithologist.
Joe Higgs, 59, Jamaican reggae musician, cancer.
Dennis W. Sciama, 73, British physicist.
John Southgate, 73, British Anglican priest.
Benito Stefanelli, 71, Italian film actor, stuntman and weapons master.
Bertha Swirles, 96, British physicist.
Logan Wright, 66, American pediatric psychologist, heart attack.

19
Bal Dani, 66, Indian cricket player.
Brendan Hansen, 77, Australian politician.
Desmond Llewelyn, 85, British film actor, played Q in the James Bond film series, traffic accident.
Marion Worth, 69, American country music singer, complications of emphysema.

20
Dick Bertell, 64, American baseball player, influenza.
Riccardo Freda, 90, Italian film director.
Mario Carreño Morales, 86, Cuban painter.
Carin Nilsson, 95, Swedish freestyle swimmer and Olympic medalist.
Irving Rapper, 101, American film director.
Hank Snow, 85, Canadian country musician, heart failure.
James Wainwright, 61, American actor.

21
John Arnatt, 82, British actor.
Bill Edwards, 81, American actor, rodeo rider, and artist.
Michael P. Malone, 59, American historian, cardiomyopathy, heart attack.
Bernard Smith, 92, American literary editor, film producer and literary critic.
Frank Stanley, 77, American cinematographer.
Jalil Ziapour, 79, Iranian painter and academic.

22
Per Aabel, 97, Norwegian actor, artist, dancer and choreographer.
Hans Frankenthal, 73, German Holocaust survivor.
Tamara Lees, 75, English film actress.
Ola Oni, 66, Nigerian political economist, socialist and human right activist.
Louis Pohl, 84, American painter, illustrator, printmaker and cartoonist.
Benny Quick, 55, German pop and schlager singer, suicide.

23
Martin Charteris, Baron Charteris of Amisfield, 86, British Army officer and courtier of Queen Elizabeth II.
John Paton Davies, Jr., 91, American diplomat and Medal of Freedom recipient.
Wallace Diestelmeyer, 73, Canadian figure skater and Olympic medalist.
Timur Gaidar, 73, Soviet and Russian rear admiral, writer and journalist.
Silvio Gava, 98, Italian politician.
Lois Hamilton, 56, American model, actress and author, suicide.
Miroslav Ivanov, 70, Popular Czech nonfiction writer.
Vladimir Kondrashin, 70, Soviet and Russian basketball player and coach.
Marcel Landowski, 84, French composer, biographer and arts administrator.
Billy McGlen, 78, English football player.
Eirene White, Baroness White, 90, British politician and journalist.

24
Kadathanat Madhavi Amma, 90, Indian Malayalam  poet, novelist and short story writer.
Tomasz Beksiński, 41, Polish radio presenter, suicide.
Peter Boroffka, 67, German politician and member of the Bundestag.
Bill Bowerman, 88, American track and field coach and co-founder of Nike, Inc..
Reggie Carter, 42, American basketball player.
Billy Davenport, 68, American drummer.
Maurice Couve de Murville, 92, French politician, 152nd Prime Minister of France.
João Figueiredo, 81, 30th President of Brazil, cardiovascular disease.
Tito Guízar, 91, American singer and actor, pneumonia.
Jiang Hua, 92, President of the Supreme Court of China.
Joseph McGahn, 82, American politician.
William C. Schneider, 76, American aerospace engineer and NASA mission director.
Grete Stern, 95, German-Argentine photographer.

25
Arne Ileby, 86, Norwegian football player.
Peter Jeffrey, 70, English actor, prostate cancer.
Zully Moreno, 79, Argentine film actress, Alzheimer's disease.
Michael Bamidele Otiko, 65, Nigerian politician and educator.
Alfonso Lastras Ramírez, 75, Mexican lawyer and politician.

26
Benny Bartlett, 75, American child actor and musician.
Vitold Belevitch, 78, Belgian mathematician and electrical engineer.
Ola Skjåk Bræk, 87, Norwegian banker and politician.
Prunella Clough, 80, British artist, cancer.
Fred Draper, 74, American film and television actor.
David Duncan, 86, American screenwriter and novelist.
Leah Leneman, 55, American historian and cookery writer.
Curtis Mayfield, 57, American singer-songwriter and record producer, complications from diabetes.
Shankar Dayal Sharma, 81, 9th president of India, heart attack.

27
Leslie Brown, 87, British Anglican prelate.
Pierre Clémenti, 57, French actor, liver cancer.
Leonard Goldenson, 94, American TV and radio executive.
Michael McDowell, 49, American novelist and screenwriter, AIDS-related illness.
Dick Peabody, 74, American actor, prostate cancer.
Horst Matthai Quelle, 87, German philosopher.

28
Josephine Barnes, 87, English obstetrician and gynaecologist.
Joachim Böhmer, 59, East German rower and Olympic medalist.
Franco Castellano, 74, Italian screenwriter and film director.
Donald Cotton, 71, British writer for radio and television.
Louis Féraud, 78, French fashion designer and artist, Alzheimer's disease.
Kenneth Hudson, 83, British journalist and broadcaster.
Larry Dale Lee, 41, American financial and economic journalist, stabbed.
Clayton Moore, 85, American actor, heart attack.
Mike Thresher, 68, English football player.

29
Robert Hoffstetter, 91, French taxonomist and herpetologist.
Edward Hollamby, 78, English architect and town planner, heart disease.
Ferenc Rabár, 70, Hungarian politician.
Leon Radzinowicz, 93, Polish-British criminologist.
José Cláudio dos Reis, 60, Brazilian sports administrator.
Gerard Veringa, 75, Dutch politician.
Jerzy Waldorff, 89, Polish baron, TV personality and writer.

30
Tom Aherne, 80, Irish footballer and hurler.
Clint Albright, 73, Canadian ice hockey player.
Arthur Bassett, 85, Welsh rugby player.
Kjølv Egeland, 81, Norwegian politician.
Anna Fehér, 78, Hungarian gymnast and Olympic silver medalist.
Sarah Knauss, 119, American supercentenarian and oldest person in the world.
Fritz Leonhardt, 90, German structural engineer.
Nicholas Marangello, 98, American mobster (Bonanno crime family).
Louis Michel, 76, French mathematical physicist.

31
Conrado Balweg, Filipino Roman Catholic priest and communist revolutionary, shot.
Dean Elliott, 82, American television and film composer, Alzheimer's disease.
Ferdinand Finne, 89, Norwegian author, painter, theater decorator and costume designer.
William Hughes, Baron Hughes, 88, British politician.
Abul Hasan Ali Hasani Nadwi, 85, Indian Islamic scholar and author.
Solomiia Pavlychko, 41, Ukrainian literary critic, philosopher, and feminist, carbon monoxide poisoning.
Elliot Richardson, 79, American politician and diplomat, cerebral hemorrhage.
Hamako Watanabe, 89, Japanese singer.

References 

1999-12
 12